Otandeka Kanyesigye Laki (born 24 January 1996) is a Ugandan footballer who plays as a winger and a striker for Doncaster Rovers Belles and the Uganda women's national team.

Early life and education
Laki was born in The Bronx, New York, United States and raised in Marlboro Township, New Jersey to Ugandan parents – her father being an ambassador. She has attended the Colts Neck High School.

Club career
Laki has played for SV 67 Weinberg and MSV Duisburg II in Germany and for New Jersey Copa in the United States.

Laki signed for English club Doncaster Rovers Belles in October 2022, making her debut against Peterborough United.

International career
Laki was capped for Uganda at senior level during the 2016 CECAFA Women's Championship, where she scored two goals, and the 2021 COSAFA Women's Championship.

International goals
Scores and results list Uganda goal tally first

Personal life
Nicknamed Oti, Laki has studied journalism and media studies at the Rutgers University.

References

External links

 Otandeka Laki at doncasterroversfc.co.uk

1996 births
Living people
People with acquired Ugandan citizenship
Ugandan women's footballers
Women's association football wingers
Women's association football forwards
MSV Duisburg (women) players
Doncaster Rovers Belles L.F.C. players
2. Frauen-Bundesliga players
Uganda women's international footballers
Ugandan expatriate women's footballers
Ugandan expatriates in Germany
Sportspeople from the Bronx
Soccer players from New York City
People from Marlboro Township, New Jersey
Sportspeople from Monmouth County, New Jersey
Soccer players from New Jersey
American women's soccer players
African-American women's soccer players
American expatriate women's soccer players
American expatriate soccer players in Germany
Rutgers University alumni
American people of Ugandan descent
American sportspeople of African descent